Ickham and Well is a mostly rural civil parish east of Canterbury in Kent, South East England.

The parish covers the villages of Ickham and Bramling just off the A257 Sandwich Road. It has several listed buildings in architecture of old, well-preserved houses, with the 13th-century parish church of St John the Evangelist in the midst. A recent archaeological excavation at Ickham has revealed evidence of Roman metalwork and copper brooches.

Geography
Ickham centres on a single road.

The Rivers Little Stour and Wingham flow through the parish before joining with the Great Stour to become the River Stour.

Notable people
Edward Isaac (16th-century), English Protestant and Marian exile.
J. G. Robertson (1859–1940), British singer and actor died in Ickham.

References

External links

Civil parishes in Kent
City of Canterbury